La Libération de Paris (The Liberation of Paris) is a short historical documentary film shot in secret by small units of the French Resistance during the Battle for Paris in August 1944.

Production
In 1943, a group of French filmmakers, which included Louis Daquin, Jean Grémillon, Jacques Becker, and Pierre Renoir (Jean's brother), founded the Comité de libération du cinéma français.  Technicians from this group filmed the uprising in Paris from its beginnings on August 19, 1944, and the footage was developed and edited for the film, which was released to French theaters on September 1, 1944, immediately after the German departure from the occupied territories.

See also
 Liberation of Paris
 Is Paris Burning? (1966)

Notes

Media links
 La Libération de Paris, Archive.org

1944 films
1940s French-language films
Documentary films about World War II
French short documentary films
20th century in Paris
1944 documentary films
Black-and-white documentary films
Documentary films about Paris
Films with screenplays by Pierre Bost
French black-and-white films
French Resistance
1940s short documentary films
1940s French films